Exaltación (or Exaltation of the Holy Cross) is a town in Yacuma Province in the Beni Department of northern Bolivia.

History
The Jesuit mission of Exaltación was founded in 1709. Cayubaba Indians resided at the mission.

References

External links
Satellite map at Maplandia.com

Populated places in Beni Department
Jesuit Missions of Moxos